Acacia rigens, commonly known as nealie, is an erect or spreading shrub or small tree that is endemic to Australia. Other common names include needle wattle, needlebush acacia, nealia and nilyah.

Description
The bright yellow flowerheads appear in groups of up to four in the axils of the phyllodes.

Taxonomy
The species was first formally described in 1832 by botanist Allan Cunningham. It resembles Acacia havilandiorum but has longer phyllodes and 4-merous flowers. The specific epithet is thought to be a reference to the rigidity of the phyllodes.

Distribution
The species occurs on red earth, sandy or shaly soils in mallee and woodland in southern Western Australia, South Australia, Victoria, New South Wales and Queensland.

Cultivation
The species is fast-growing and is both frost and drought tolerant, rarely requiring watering after establishment. It is adaptable to most soils and is best suited to a position in full sun or light shade.

The larvae of the double-spotted lineblue butterfly feed on this species.

See also
 List of Acacia species

References

rigens
Flora of New South Wales
Flora of Queensland
Flora of South Australia
Flora of Victoria (Australia)
Acacias of Western Australia
Fabales of Australia
Plants described in 1832
Taxa named by Allan Cunningham (botanist)